Willie Columbus Ponder (born February 14, 1980 in Tulsa, Oklahoma) is a former professional American football player who played wide receiver for 3 seasons for the New York Giants and one season with Seattle Seahawks and St. Louis Rams. 
He has 2 older daughters Kaia and McKenzie Ponder and 4 younger children . Willow , Wille Ponder iii , Emma and Columbus ....

Professional career
Ponder played college football at Southeast Missouri State University and was drafted in the sixth round (199th pick overall) of the 2003 NFL Draft by the New York Giants.  He has contributed as kickoff returner in 2004, when he led the NFL with a kickoff return average of 26.9 yards, the first Giant to lead the NFL in average kickoff return yardage since Clarence Childs in 1964 (David Meggett led the NFC in 1990).  For New York, he returned two kickoffs for touchdowns, the first coming against the Pittsburgh Steelers in 2004 and second coming in the 2005 season opener against Arizona.  Ponder was benched ten games into the 2005 season despite a kickoff return average of 25.9 yards, in favor of Chad Morton.  This led to a decline in the success of Giants special teams.  He has lost two fumbles in his career to date, and scored two touchdowns on kick returns as well.  He was released on September 2, 2006.  He was signed by the Seattle Seahawks on September 5, 2006 and released on October 24, 2006.  He was on the St. Louis Rams for the 2006 season but was not signed for 2007. He is also the cousin of former NFL players Jewerl and Ken Thomas.

Semi-Pro career
Ponder plays for the Oklahoma Thunder in the Gridiron Developmental Football League.

References

1980 births
American football return specialists
American football wide receivers
Coffeyville Red Ravens football players
Living people
New York Giants players
Sportspeople from Tulsa, Oklahoma
Seattle Seahawks players
Southeast Missouri State Redhawks football players
St. Louis Rams players